George Herbert Dale (2 May 1892 – 28 October 1961) was an English professional footballer who played as an inside forward.

Club career
Born in Belvedere, Kent, Dale started his professional career with Notts County, where he would score five goals in eighteen appearances. He moved to Queens Park Rangers, where he would go on to score forty goals in 110 games.

He went on to play for Chelsea, where he made 49 appearances, scoring once.

References

1892 births
1961 deaths
Footballers from Belvedere, London
Footballers from Kent
English footballers
Association football forwards
Clapton F.C. players
Dartford F.C. players
Notts County F.C. players
Queens Park Rangers F.C. players
Chelsea F.C. players
Weymouth F.C. players
VCD Athletic F.C. players